Urban Driftwood is an album by Yasmin Williams released under Spinster on January 29, 2021. The album was written and recorded during 2020, and was inspired by the George Floyd protests.

Description 
The album comes after Williams' 2018 debut album, Unwind and features appearances from Taryn Wood and Amadou Kouaye. Williams predominantly uses fingerstyle guitar in the album but at times includes the Mbira and tap shoes. Urban Driftwood was recorded in several studios located in the U.S. state of Maryland.

References

2021 albums